DeMarvion Overshown (born August 13, 2000) is an American football linebacker for the Texas Longhorns. After the 2022 season, Overshown declared for the 2023 NFL Draft.

High school career
Overshown attended Arp High School in Arp, Texas. As a senior, he had 142 tackles and five sacks. He played in the 2018 Under Armour All-America Game. He committed to the University of Texas at Austin to play college football.

College career
OVershown played safety his first two years at Texas. Over his first two years he played in 17 games and had 19 tackles, two sacks and one interception. Prior to his junior year in 2020, he switched to linebacker. He started all 10 games that year, recording 60 tackles, one sack and two interceptions. Overshown returned to Texas for his senior year in 2021 rather than enter the 2021 NFL Draft.

College statistics

References

External links
Texas Longhorns bio

Living people
Sportspeople from Tyler, Texas
Players of American football from Texas
American football linebackers
Texas Longhorns football players
2000 births